SS Thomas McKean was a Liberty ship built in the United States during World War II. She was named after Founding Father Thomas McKean, an American lawyer and politician from New Castle, in New Castle County, Delaware and Philadelphia. During the American Revolution he was a delegate to the Continental Congress where he signed the Continental Association, United States Declaration of Independence and the Articles of Confederation. McKean served as a President of Congress. He was at various times a member of the Federalist and Democratic-Republican parties. McKean served as President of Delaware, Chief Justice of Pennsylvania, and Governor of Pennsylvania. He is also known for holding copious public positions.

Construction
Thomas McKean was laid down on 5 November 1941, under a Maritime Commission (MARCOM) contract, MCE hull 301, by the Bethlehem-Fairfield Shipyard, Baltimore, Maryland; and was launched on 30 April 1942.

History
She was allocated to Calmar Steamship Corp., on 29 May 1942.

Sinking
One of the torpedoes struck aft of hold #5, destroying the stern /50 caliber gun and killing three Armed guards. The captain, Mellin Edwin Respess, ordered the crew of eight officers, 31 crewmen, 17 Armed guards, and four passengers were forced to abandon ship in the four lifeboats.

U-505 surfaced about 20 minutes later and fired 72 rounds into Thomas McKean with her  deck gun, setting her on fire and sinking her at 15:22. U-505 then questioned the survivors and administered first aid before leaving.

The four lifeboats became separated over the next few days. Two lifeboats, with 29 survivors, made landfall at St. Thomas, Virgin Islands, on 4 July. One lifeboat made land at Antigua, 12 July, with 12 survivors. The last lifeboat, with 14 survivors and one dead, made landfall at Miches, Dominican Republic, on 14 July.

U-505 was famously captured on 4 June 1944, and is now a museum ship at the Museum of Science and Industry, in Chicago, Illinois.

References

Bibliography

 
 
 
 
 

 

Liberty ships
Ships built in Baltimore
1942 ships
Ships sunk by German submarines in World War II
World War II shipwrecks in the Atlantic Ocean
Ships named for Founding Fathers of the United States